Constitution Place is a park in Canberra, the capital of Australia.  The area was named in February 1998 by Prime Minister of Australia John Howard during the course of the Fourth Constitutional Convention on the options for an Australian republic. The park is located to the south-east of Old Parliament House and adjoining the Old Parliament House Gardens and nearby to the National Archives of Australia.  It is semicircular in shape, with curved road frontages on King George Terrace, Walpole Crescent and Queen Victoria Terrace.  There is also a windbreak of trees, which were planted by Charles Weston as superintendent of parks and gardens in Canberra.

The focal point of the park is an information board, seat and unveiling plaque.

References

External links

Parks in Canberra